A home video game console is a standardized computing device tailored for video gaming that requires a computer monitor or television set as an output. Handheld controllers are commonly used as input devices. Video game consoles may use one or more data storage device, such as hard disk drives, optical discs, and memory cards for downloaded content. Each are usually developed by a single business organization. Dedicated consoles are a subset of these devices only able to play built-in games. Video game consoles in general are also described as "dedicated" in distinction from the more versatile personal computer and other consumer electronics. Sanders Associates engineer Ralph H. Baer along with company employees Bill Harrison and Bill Rusch licensed their television gaming technology to contemporary major TV manufacturer Magnavox. This resulted in Magnavox Odyssey's 1972 release—the first commercially available video game console.

A handheld game console is a lightweight device with a built-in screen, games controls, speakers, and has greater portability than a standard video game console. It is capable of playing multiple games unlike tabletop and handheld electronic game devices. Tabletop and handheld electronic game devices of the 1970s and early 1980s are the precursors of handheld game consoles. Mattel introduced the first handheld electronic game with the 1977 release of Auto Race. Later, several companies—including Coleco and Milton Bradley—made their own single-game, lightweight tabletop or handheld electronic game devices. The oldest handheld game console with interchangeable cartridges is the Milton Bradley Microvision in 1979. Nintendo is credited with popularizing the handheld console concept with the Game Boy's release in 1989 and continues to dominate the handheld console market.

Best-selling game consoles 

The following table contains video game consoles that have sold at least  units worldwide either through to consumers or inside retail channels. Each console include sales from every iteration unless otherwise noted. The years correspond to when the home or handheld game console was first released—excluding test markets. Each year links to the corresponding "year in video games".

Notes

References

WonderSwan Famitsu sources

 
 
 
 
 
 
 
 
 
 
 
 
 
 
 
 

Release year sources

 Atari consoles
 : "The test release of the Atari 7800 went by practically unnoticed [...] And so the Atari 7800 collected dust for two years, until the international success of the Nintendo Entertainment System quickly changed the minds of Atari's new management. [...] Atari shipped the now slightly outdated 7800 across the world. [...] Only a few thousand 7800 consoles were shipped in the US during the first marketing attempt."
 : Atari VCS 2600, Atari 5200, Atari Lynx.
 Microsoft consoles
 
 Nintendo consoles
 
 
 : "Nintendo teamed with Mitsubishi to build the video-game system and, in 1977, Nintendo entered the home market in Japan with the dramatic unveiling of Color TV Game 6 [...]"
 Sega consoles
 
 
 
 
 
 Sony consoles
 
 Others
 : Bandai Wonderswan and ColecoVision.
 : Nokia N-Gage.
 
 
 : "To push its first video-game system, NEC formed a home-entertainment group and released PC Engine in Japan in October 1987."
 : "Philips released CD-I years behind schedule, in October 1991, months after CDTV, because of technical problems."
 

Bibliography

 
 

Lists of video game consoles
Video game consoles
 
Video game console sales